The North-East Regional Political Front (NERPF) was a political coalition that was formed on 21 October 2013 by eleven political parties in Northeast India. The motive of the new political front was to protect the interest of the people of the region. Prafulla Kumar Mahanta was appointed as the chief adviser of the front.

Members 
The following  parties are members of NERPF:

Support for NDA
NERPF have pledged their alliance with the NDA for General elections, 2014 to ensure peace and development in the northeastern states.

North East Democratic Alliance 
In 2016, the NERPF was expanded and renamed as North-East Democratic Alliance.

See also
 National Democratic Alliance
 Coalition government

References 

 

National Democratic Alliance
Political parties established in 1998
Coalition governments of India
Defunct political party alliances in India
Conservative parties in India